Connie Meijer (5 February 1963 – 17 August 1988) was a Dutch cyclist who won a bronze medal in the road race at the 1987 UCI Road World Championships. She won a national title in this event in 1984, as well as individual stages of the Tour of Norway in 1987 and 1988.

On 17 August 1988, while competing in a criterium in Naaldwijk, she complained of severe nausea and died on the way to the hospital. Initial reports stated that she died of a brain hemorrhage. However, later reports stated that she died of a heart attack, likely caused by a neglected flu.

In her memory, the Connie Meijer Trofee was created, for which women compete in Parel van de Veluwe (Meijer herself won this race in 1988).

References

1963 births
1988 deaths
Dutch female cyclists
People from Vlaardingen
UCI Road World Championships cyclists for the Netherlands
Cyclists from South Holland
20th-century Dutch women